Mohammadabad-e Do Ziyarati (also Romanized as Moḩammadābād-e Do Zīyāratī and Moḩammadābād-e Dozīyārtaī) is a village in Nehzatabad Rural District, in the Central District of Rudbar-e Jonubi County, Kerman Province, Iran. At the 2006 census, its population was 850, in 143 families.

References 

Populated places in Rudbar-e Jonubi County